The 2019 Asian Junior and Cadet Table Tennis Championships were held in Ulaanbaatar, Mongolia, from 2 to 7 September 2019. It was organised by the Mongolian Table Tennis Association under the authority of Asian Table Tennis Union (ATTU).

Medal summary

Events

Medal table

See also

2019 World Junior Table Tennis Championships
2019 Asian Table Tennis Championships
Asian Table Tennis Union

References

Asian Junior and Cadet Table Tennis Championships
Asian Junior and Cadet Table Tennis Championships
Asian Junior and Cadet Table Tennis Championships 
Asian Junior and Cadet Table Tennis Championships
Table tennis in Mongolia
International sports competitions hosted by Mongolia
Asian Junior and Cadet Table Tennis Championships